Tinsukia (Pron: ˌtɪnˈsʊkiə) is an industrial town.

It is the administrative headquarters of Tinsukia District of Assam, India.

History 
During the reign of Sudangphaa (1397-1407), the relatively small Ahom kingdom was attacked by Mong Kawng, a Shan state in what is today Upper Burma. A Mong Kwang army sent under General Ta-chin-Pao advanced up to Tipam but was subsequently defeated and pushed back as far as the Kham Jang territory. The generals of the two armies conducted a peace treaty on the shore of the Nong Jake lake and in accordance with the Tai custom dipped their hands in the lake, fixing the boundary of the two kingdoms at Patkai hills.

Tinsukia is the site of Bengmara, which was originally known as Changmai Pathar. It was the capital of the Matak kingdom which was founded by Swargadeo Sarbananda Singha.

Swargadeo Sarbananda Singha,  known as Mezara, was a member of the erstwhile Chutia royal family and rose to become an able administrator.  Mezara adopted the name Sarbananda Singha after he became the king. Swargadeo Sarbananda Singha introduced coins in his name and in Saka 1716 and 1717, he inscribed the title Swargadeo in the coins.

Geography
It has an average elevation of 116 metres (380 feet).

Demographics
According to the 2011 census, Tinsukia had a population of 126,389. Males constituted 55% of the population and females 45%. Tinsukia had an average literacy rate of 70.15%, higher than the national average of 64.84%; male literacy was 77.89%, and female literacy 63.54%. 13.29% of the population was under 6 years of age.

Tinisukia city have a population of 126,389 as per 2011 census. Hindi is spoken at 40,087, Bengali at 38,452, Assamese by 24,762 people, Nepali at 2,194 and 13,548 people speaks other languages.

Politics
Tinsukia is part of Dibrugarh (Lok Sabha constituency). Sanjoy Kishan of BJP is the current MLA of Tinsukia (Vidhan Sabha constituency).

Media
The Assamese daily Dainik Janambhumi is published from Tinsukia along with Guwahati and Jorhat.

Notable people from Tinsukia
 Bhupen Hazarika
 Mahika Sharma
 Savitri Jindal
 Harekrishna Deka

Notes

References

External links 

 Tinsukia district official website